Anisocerini is a tribe of longhorn beetles of the subfamily Lamiinae.

Taxonomy
 Acanthotritus
 Anisocerus
 Badenella
 Batesbeltia
 Caciomorpha
 Chalastinus
 Chapareia
 Cyclopeplus
 Demophoo
 Eusthenomus
 Fredlanella
 Gounellea
 Gymnocerina
 Gymnocerus
 Homoephloeus
 Hoplistocerus
 Jurua
 Onychocerus
 Parachalastinus
 Phacellocera
 Phacellocerina
 Platysternus
 Satipoella
 Thryallis
 Trigonopeplus
 Xylotribus

References

 
Lamiinae